The Marriage Alliance is an Australian lobby group based in Sydney, New South Wales which supports the definition of marriage between a man and a woman as found in the Marriage Amendment Act 2004. According to the group's website, it "is an independent alliance bringing together individuals and organisations supporting a common cause. We exist to voice the opinion of the silent majority of Australians that respect same-sex attracted people, but do not want to change the current definition of marriage." They campaign against same-sex marriage.

In November 2018 the group rebranded as Binary Australia with the stated aim to "carry on the fight for traditional values that celebrate the inherent differences between boys and girls, men and women".

Campaigns
Marriage Alliance partnered with the Coalition for Marriage and other groups opposed to same-sex marriage, to campaign for a 'No' vote in the 2017 Australian Marriage Law Postal Survey.

They have conducted an extensive and controversial anti-gay marriage campaign in the media and on social media:
 Ads initially accepted for broadcast by Channels 7 and 10, with management of those channels later deciding to not do so, were subsequently, and controversially, broadcast by Foxtel.
 a 'rainbow noose' advert "claiming that same-sex marriage will increase suicide because people who are against it will be bullied over their views if it becomes law".
 a YouTube presentation 'It's not as simple as you think'.
 anti-Safe Schools pamphlets.

Other activities
They have also
published articles attacking proponents of gay marriage, such as Totalitarianism and the Hypocrisy of the Homosexual Agenda.
created an iOS and Android app to disseminate their material.

Associated bodies
Australia
 Anglican Diocese of Sydney
 Australian Catholic Bishops' Conference
 Australian Christian Churches
 Australian Christian Lobby
 FamilyVoice Australia
US
 National Organization for Marriage

People
 Ashley Goldsworthy, board member
 Damian Wyld, CEO
 Sophie York, spokesperson

See also
 World Congress of Families

References

Organisations based in Sydney
2015 establishments in Australia
Political advocacy groups in Australia